OpenSkies  was a French airline owned by International Airlines Group (IAG) which operated under the Level brand prior to closing down, and before that operated under its own brand name. Its headquarters were located in Rungis, near Paris.

The airline launched as a brand of BA European Limited in June 2008, but in April 2009 the name was transferred to Elysair (which had operated as L'Avion). The airline was a full-service carrier and offered three class service cabins on board its aircraft, operating between Paris Orly Airport in France and both Newark and New York in the United States.

OpenSkies ceased to operate under its own brand after summer 2018 to operate for IAG's new low-cost subsidiary brand Level. Following the suspension of operations due to the COVID-19 pandemic in March 2020, the airline was initially reported to have been in the process of being shut down by IAG on 8 July 2020, and although ticket reservations were later reopened for the resumption of services, operations never restarted and ticket reservations were subsequently closed for Level Europe which shut down. The long-haul business still runs as of January 2023.

History 

British Airways wanted to reduce its dependence on its Heathrow Airport hub by flying between the United States and cities in continental Europe. The routes that OpenSkies operated were made possible due to the EU-US Open Skies Agreement, which permits any airline based in the United States or the European Union to operate services to and from any EU or American location. The availability of landing slots limits the impact of the agreement at certain airports, such as London Heathrow Airport.

With the creation of an Open Skies agreement between Europe and the United States in March 2008, British Airways started a new subsidiary airline called BA European Limited, trading as Openskies (previously known as "Project Lauren"). which launched originally with a United Kingdom Civil Aviation Authority Type A Operating Licence. This permitted the airline to carry passengers, cargo, and mail on aircraft with 20 or more seats. The operating licence was suspended on 6 May 2009 for three months following the transfer of the name to Elysair, at BA European's request. The CAA certificate eventually was surrendered in favour of operating under a certificate issued by the French Ministère de la Transition écologique et solidaire.

OpenSkies' first flight, from New York, was on 19 June 2008, using a single Boeing 757 transferred from the BA fleet. In July 2008 BA bought French airline L'Avion for £54 million.  BA European's operations merged with L'Avion on 4 April 2009, forming OpenSkies. In 2008, potential future routes for the airline reportedly included Dublin, Frankfurt, Madrid, Brussels, Rome, and Milan.

The third destination for Openskies was Amsterdam, when flights began on 15 October 2008, and Newark became an additional destination when L'Avion was integrated into OpenSkies on 4 April 2009. On 24 July 2009, the airline announced that the route from New York-JFK to Amsterdam Schiphol would be suspended as of 16 August, for economic reasons. On 30 September the airline announced that the Washington to Paris service would be suspended from 29 October.

In December 2009, the airline announced a change of its New York operations: in January 2010, all OpenSkies flights were shifted from John F. Kennedy International Airport (JFK) to Newark. The airline restored service from JFK to Orly on 31 March 2013. Also in 2013, the airline announced a codesharing agreement with American Airlines.

OpenSkies joined the Oneworld alliance as an affiliate member on 1 December 2012, of which parent British Airways is a founding member. British Airways Executive Club members were then able to claim tier points and BA miles on OpenSkies flights.

On 28 November 2017, IAG announced that its low-cost airline brand Level would launch flights in July 2018 from Paris Orly Airport, which would be operated by staff that were currently employed by OpenSkies and using the airline's air operator's certificate. In preparation for the change, OpenSkies' IATA code was changed from EC to LV in May 2018. The OpenSkies brand ceased to operate on 2 September 2018, after which all its staff began to operate Level flights.

FlightGlobal stated that the retirement of the last OpenSkies branded aircraft "marked the end of the OpenSkies brand, from a public-facing perspective." OpenSkies began operating as Level France, with the same employees since operating under a new brand, with flight crew retrained to fly Airbus aircraft.

On 8 July 2020, IAG reported the shutdown of OpenSkies due to the impact of the COVID-19 pandemic on aviation and passenger demand. Following IAG's announcement however, reservations for flights operated by the airline were reopened at a later date for services resuming in October 2020, later postponed to December 2020, though operations ultimately never resumed and reservations were subsequently closed for Level Europe which shut down. The long-haul business still runs as of January 2023.

Destinations

Level brand destinations 

Starting in July 2018, OpenSkies began the operation of flights to the following destinations on behalf of Level, until the grounding of its aircraft and suspension of operations due to the COVID-19 pandemic in March 2020, followed by the airline's closure in July 2020:

Former OpenSkies brand destinations 
Starting in June 2008, OpenSkies operated scheduled flights to the following destinations under its own brand name until September 2018:

Codeshare agreements 
OpenSkies had codeshare agreements with the following airlines:

 American Airlines
 British Airways

Fleet 

The OpenSkies fleet, which was operated under the Level brand, consisted of the following aircraft at the time the airline was shut down in July 2020:

Historical fleet 
OpenSkies previously operated the following aircraft types under its own brand name until September 2018:

Fleet development
In February 2009, British Airways announced that it would not transfer additional 757s to its OpenSkies subsidiary by the end of 2009 beyond the one already transferred, as originally planned, but instead would sell them to a third party. OpenSkies was originally to expand to six aircraft by the end of 2009, but BA said this plan had been cancelled.

On 8 April 2016, Openskies announced the addition of a Boeing 767 aircraft in a three-class configuration, transferred from parent British Airways which was retiring its 3-class 767 fleet. The aircraft, which was assigned to the Newark – Paris Orly route on select days, entered service in August 2016. It also provided OpenSkies with a spare aircraft.

In July 2018, the Airbus A330-200 was introduced to the OpenSkies fleet, branded as Level in preparation for the retirement of the OpenSkies brand. At the time of OpenSkies' brand retirement on 2 September 2018, the airline operated one Boeing 757-200 and one Boeing 767-300ER not under the Level brand. Both aircraft were initially ferried to storage and retired on 3 September 2018, while the 757-200 (MSN-25808) was later taken over by Cabo Verde Airlines.

References

External links 

 Official website of Level
 

Defunct airlines of France
Airlines established in 2008
Airlines disestablished in 2020
British Airways
Companies based in Île-de-France
Oneworld affiliate members
Business class airlines
French companies established in 2008
French companies disestablished in 2020
Airlines disestablished due to the COVID-19 pandemic